"Psycho Bitch" (stylized as "Psycho B**ch" on the main cover) is a song by Mexican singer Thalía written by her for her upcoming nineteenth studio album. It was released by Sony Music Latin as the album's lead single on November 4, 2022.

Background and release
The song was released on November 4, 2022 along with its music video, marking Thalía's return to her pop music roots and topping the iTunes charts in Mexico, Argentina, Guatemala, Costa Rica, and the U.S. Latin area. Thalía stated that she fell in love with the song from the first time she heard the music demo and decided to record it but when she heard the first version she didn't like how it turned out and decided to start the song from scratch and in 10 minutes she wrote the final lyrics to the song adding her style into it while telling people to call her a "Psycho Bitch". Despite all this, the single's release was overshadowed by rumors that she would have insulted Shakira for her song Monotonía. Thalía would later deny those claims at the press conference for the 23rd Annual Latin Grammy Awards and also by sharing WhatsApp messages between her and Shakira to show that they are actually friends.

Music video
The music video was released on the same day as the song. The video opts for a night party aesthetic in dark areas illuminated by colored lights and a party atmosphere. The music video features Thalía dancing while on top of a giant disco ball and some backup dancers dress as dominatrixes with short black wigs which pay a tribute to her 1996 music video for her single "Gracias a Dios" where her character is a psycho. It was trending topic in different countries including the United States where it reached the 37th spot. The video reached a million views on YouTube and over 40,000 likes in just 5 days.

Charts

References 

 
Thalía songs
2022 singles
2022 songs
Spanish-language songs
Songs written by Thalía